
Gmina Słomniki is an urban-rural gmina (administrative district) in Kraków County, Lesser Poland Voivodeship, in southern Poland.

Villages
Apart from the town of Słomniki, Gmina Słomniki contains the villages and settlements of Brończyce, Czechy, Janikowice, Januszowice, Kacice, Kępa, Lipna Wola, Miłocice, Muniakowice, Niedźwiedź, Orłów, Polanowice, Prandocin, Prandocin-Iły, Prandocin-Wysiołek, Ratajów, Smroków, Szczepanowice, Trątnowice, Waganowice, Wesoła, Wężerów, Zaborze and Zagaje Smrokowskie.

Neighbouring gminas
Gmina Słomniki is bordered by the gminas of Gołcza, Iwanowice, Kocmyrzów-Luborzyca, Koniusza, Miechów and Radziemice.

References
Polish official population figures 2006

Slomniki
Kraków County